Alexander Theo (born 11 February 1969) is a Liberian footballer. He played in two matches for the Liberia national football team in 1995 and 1996. He was also named in Liberia's squad for the 1996 African Cup of Nations tournament.

References

1969 births
Living people
Liberian footballers
Liberia international footballers
1996 African Cup of Nations players
Place of birth missing (living people)
Association football defenders